Seoul Jesus (lit. "Seoul Emperor") is a 1986 South Korean film written and directed by Jang Sun-woo.

Synopsis
A mental patient who believes himself to be Jesus escapes from a mental institution and travels to Seoul planning to save the city from judgment.

Cast
 Kim Myung-gon... Jesus
 Oh Su-mi... Woman
 An Yong-nam... Child
 Na Han-il... Male nurse
 Kang Sung-ran... Female nurse
 Park Sang-jo... Doctor
 Kim Gil-ho... 최회장
 Na Ki-su... 왕초
 Kook Jong-hwan... 관리인
 Park Jae-hong... Fisherman

Notes

Bibliography
 
 

1986 films
1980s Korean-language films
South Korean drama films
Films directed by Jang Sun-woo
1986 directorial debut films